Scopula andalusiaria  is a moth of the family Geometridae. It is found in Spain and western North Africa.

Taxonomy
The species was considered to be a valid species by Redondo & Gáston in 1999 and Scoble in 1999. However, Müller treated it as a subspecies of Scopula humifusaria  in 1996. Hausmann reinstated it as a species in 2004.

References

Moths described in 1935
Taxa named by Louis Beethoven Prout
andalusiaria
Moths of Europe
Moths of Africa